The 2007 Bucknell Bison football team was an American football team that represented Bucknell University during the 2007 NCAA Division I FCS football season. Bucknell tied for last in the Patriot League.

In their fifth year under head coach Tim Landis, the Bison compiled a 3–8 record. Jonathan Grainger and Ryan Slater were the team captains.

The Bison were outscored 346 to 231. Bucknell's 1–5 conference record tied with Georgetown for sixth the seven-team Patriot League standings.

Bucknell played its home games at Christy Mathewson–Memorial Stadium on the university campus in Lewisburg, Pennsylvania.

Schedule

References

Bucknell
Bucknell Bison football seasons
Bucknell Bison football